The year 1810 in architecture involved some significant architectural events and new buildings.

Buildings and structures

Buildings opened
 February 10 – Odessa Opera and Ballet Theater, Ukraine, designed by Jean-François Thomas de Thomon, opened.
 November 30 – St. Andrew's Presbyterian Church, Quebec City, Canada inaugurated.

Buildings completed

 St. George Orthodox Church, Chandanapally, India (original building).
 Basílica del Santísimo Sacramento, Colonia del Sacramento, Uruguay, designed by Tomás Toribio.
 Old Saint Petersburg Stock Exchange, Russia, designed by Jean-François Thomas de Thomon, completed.
 Commercial Rooms, Bristol, England, designed by Charles Busby.
 City hall, Groningen, Netherlands, designed by Jacob Otten Husly in 1775, completed.
 Northgate, Chester, England, designed by Thomas Harrison.
 Old Market, Dominica.
 Gignac Bridge, France, designed by Bertrand Garipuy in 1776, completed by Billoin and Fontenay.

Events
 Rebuilding of the Church of the Holy Sepulchre in Jerusalem.

Births
 June 19 – Charles Wilson, Scottish neoclassical architect (died 1863)
 February 24 – William Mason, English-born New Zealand architect (died 1897)
 April 1 – Benjamin Ferrey, English architect (died 1880)
 date unknown – John Notman, Scottish-born American architect (died 1865)

Deaths
 January 19 – Jan Ferdynand Nax, Polish architect, economist and social reformer (born 1736)
 January 23 – Francesco Piranesi, Italian engraver, etcher and architect (born 1756 or 1758)

References

Architecture
Years in architecture
19th-century architecture